Spring Lake, Minnesota may refer to:
Spring Lake, Isanti County, Minnesota, an unincorporated community in Isanti County
Spring Lake, Itasca County, Minnesota, an unincorporated community in Itasca County
Spring Lake, Scott County, Minnesota, an unincorporated community in Scott County